Springfield is a city in and the county seat of Robertson County, which is located in Middle Tennessee on the northern border of the state. As of the 2020 census, the city's population was 18,782.

Geography
Springfield is located at  (36.499508, -86.878717).

Transportation
Highways

  /  U.S. Route 431 / Tennessee State Route 65 (Tom Austin Highway)
  /  U.S. Route 41 / Tennessee State Route 11 (Memorial Blvd)
  Tennessee State Route 76
  Tennessee State Route 49
  Tennessee State Route 25 (Lakeview Rd)
  Tennessee State Route 161 

US 41 and US 431 are the major north-south highways running through Springfield, and both run southward to Nashville. US 41 runs north from Springfield to Cedar Hill and Adams. US 431 runs north to Hopkinsville, Kentucky. The major east-west highways are State Route 76 (SR 76) and State Route 49 (SR 49). State Route 76 is mainly unsigned throughout the entire town and runs concurrently with SR 49 and US 41. It runs east from Springfield to White House and Interstate 65. State Route 49 (SR 49) runs through Springfield and intersects US 41. It runs west to Coopertown and Interstate 24. It runs east to Orlinda and Interstate 65 via State Route 52. Other minor state routes in the Springfield area are State Route 25 (SR 25) and State Route 161 (SR 161).

History
US 431 and US 41 have had different routes through Springfield. US 41 formerly had a more eastern route, now called Old Greenbrier Road. A portion of the old route was abandoned in the 1990s due to landscaping made during the construction of a railroad. The practical usage of the road was replaced by the 17th Avenue Connector. The old pavement is still visible from Bill Jones Industrial Drive. Beyond that, it ran more westernly through downtown Springfield, now called Batts Boulevard and Main Street. A portion of the old route north of downtown was removed due to the construction of a quarry. US 41 was rerouted onto Memorial Boulevard, a 4 lane highway, around 1961 after its completion.

US 431 followed a more eastern route prior to at least 2010 south of Springfield. This route had a different bridge crossing Carr Creek that has since been demolished. North of the bridge, it followed what is now called Main Street. It intersected US 41 at the junction of what is now Main Street, A C Street, and 11th Avenue. It ran with US 41 after this intersection, until its own rerouting on Memorial Boulevard in 1961. US 431 was rerouted onto Tom Austin Highway around 1983.

Airport
Springfield Robertson County Airport is a local airport north of Springfield adjacent to US 41. There are no commercial flights to or from the airport.

Climate

Demographics

2020 census

As of the 2020 United States census, there were 18,782 people, 6,356 households, and 4,362 families residing in the city.

2010 census
At the 2010 census there were 16,957 people in 6,212 households, including 3,778 families, in the city. The population density was 1,173.9 people per square mile (453.1/km). There were 5,836 housing units at an average density of 478.1 per square mile (184.5/km). The racial makeup of the city was 70.2% White, 21.4% African American, 0.1% Native American, 0.56% Asian, 0.03% Pacific Islander, 1.76% from other races, and 0.81% from two or more races. Hispanic or Latino of any race were 17.5%.

Of the 5,453 households 31.8% had children under the age of 18 living with them, 45.7% were married couples living together, 18.4% had a female householder with no husband present, and 30.7% were non-families. 25.8% of households were one person and 11.7% were one person aged 65 or older. The average household size was 2.55 and the average family size was 3.00.

The age distribution was 24.8% under the age of 18, 11.2% from 18 to 24, 29.1% from 25 to 44, 20.4% from 45 to 64, and 14.6% 65 or older. The median age was 35 years. For every 100 females, there were 92.9 males. For every 100 females age 18 and over, there were 89.1 males.

The median household income was $46,7577 and the median family income  was $42,018. Males had a median income of $32,270 versus $22,765 for females. The per capita income for the city was $22,611. About 13.7% of families and 19.0% of the population were below the poverty line, including 22.7% of those under age 18 and 17.7% of those age 65 or over.

Medical
NorthCrest Medical Center

Local politics
2016 Mayoral Election

On November 8, 2016, Vice Mayor Ann Schneider defeated Buzzy Poole in the 2016 Mayoral Election by 38 votes. One month later, she was sworn into office as Springfield's first female mayor, succeeding Billy Paul Carneal.

Recreation
The City of Springfield Parks and Recreation maintains:
American Legion Field
Garner Street Park
J. Travis Price Park
Martin Luther King Jr. Park
Springfield Greenway

Education
The city is served by 
Springfield High School
Springfield Middle School
Krisle Elementary School 
Cheatham Park Elementary School 
Westside Elementary School 
Bransford Elementary School  
Crestview Elementary School
South Haven Christian School

The Highland Crest higher education facility is home to Volunteer State Community College and Austin Peay State University.

Local notables
David Alexander, president of Pomona College and administrator of the Rhodes Scholar program, was born in Springfield
Edward Butler, Army officer in the American Revolution and former acting Inspector General of the United States Army, died in Springfield
Richard Cheatham, Whig Congressman from Tennessee, was a Springfield native and resident. His children included:
Boyd M. Cheatham, member of Tennessee's legislature, Springfield native and resident
Edward Saunders Cheatham, member of Tennessee's legislature, Springfield native and resident
Richard Boone Cheatham, member of Tennessee's legislature, born in Springfield, was later Mayor of Nashville 
Jeff Fosnes, record-setting Vanderbilt University basketball star, became a doctor in Springfield and still lives there
Daniel E. Garrett, born near Springfield, practiced law there and was elected to the state house and senate from Springfield; he later moved to Texas, where he was elected to the U.S. House of Representatives
Albert Hadley, interior designer and decorator, was born in Springfield
Charles Hartmann, New Orleans jazz trombonist and union activist, died in Springfield
Paul Henderson, African-American photojournalist, was born in Springfield
Sabi "Doc" Kumar, India-born surgeon and member of the Tennessee House of Representatives, lives in Springfield
Alice Vassar LaCour, African-American teacher and singer, was principal of an American Missionary Association school in Springfield for former slaves
Bill Monroe, musician called the "Father of Bluegrass", died in Springfield
Romeo Nelson, boogie woogie pianist, was born in Springfield
Jasen Rauch, Christian rock guitarist and songwriter, lives in Springfield
Kerry Roberts, Tennessee Senator, lives in Springfield
Bill Sanders, award-winning editorial cartoonist, was born in Springfield
Tracy Smothers, professional wrestler, was born in Springfield
Harry Underwood, self-taught "outsider artist", has his home and studio in Springfield

Sports
In 1923, Springfield hosted a Minor League Baseball team of Kentucky–Illinois–Tennessee League called the Springfield Blanket Makers.

References

External links
 Springfield Official site

Cities in Robertson County, Tennessee
Cities in Tennessee
Cities in Nashville metropolitan area
County seats in Tennessee